The Griesel Fruit Company Building is an historic building in Portland, Oregon. Completed in 1923, the structure is part of the East Portland Grand Avenue Historic District, which is listed on the National Register of Historic Places.

References

External links 
 

1923 establishments in Oregon
Buckman, Portland, Oregon
Buildings and structures completed in 1923
Buildings and structures in Portland, Oregon